SS Cleveland was a German transatlantic ocean liner that was launched in 1908 and scrapped in 1933. Cleveland was built for the Hamburg America Line (HAPAG) as a sister ship for Cincinnati.

Captain Christian Dempwolf of the SS Moltke was appointed as captain of the Cleveland in late August 1909.

In 1919 Cleveland became the troop ship USS Mobile (ID-4030). In 1920 she returned to civilian service as the UK liner King Alexander. In 1923 United American Lines bought her and restored her original name Cleveland.

In 1926 HAPAG bought Cleveland back. She was laid up from 1931 and scrapped in 1933.

Building
Blohm & Voss built Cleveland at Hamburg. She was launched on 26 September 1908, two months after her sister Cincinnati.

As built, she had berths for 2,827 passengers: 246 first class, 332 second class, 448 third class and 1,801 steerage class. She also had  of refrigerated hold space for perishable cargo.

Cleveland had twin screws, each driven by a quadruple expansion steam engine.

Early career
Cleveland began her maiden voyage from Hamburg to New York on 27 March 1909. She spent the next five years mostly in scheduled transatlantic service.

Cleveland also made six cruises around the World. On 24 January 1912 she was being moved in Honolulu Harbor when her pilot, Milton P Sanders, died of a heart attack. As a result, control of Cleveland was lost, and her bow collided with the stern of the cruiser .

By 1913 Cleveland was equipped for wireless telegraphy. Her call sign was DDV.

HAPAG had scheduled further World cruises for Cleveland and her sister for 1915. Cleveland was due to leave Hamburg on 14 January 1915 and return on 4 June. Instead, in the First World War HAPAG suspended its passenger services and Cleveland was laid up in Hamburg.

War reparations
In 1919 the United States Government seized Cincinnati as World War I reparations. She was converted at Liverpool, England into a troop ship with berths for 4,620 troops, and commissioned as USS Mobile.

Mobile made nine transatlantic crossings from France to the USA, repatriating a total of 21,073 US troops. In November 1919 she was decommissioned and relinquished to the United States Shipping Board.

White Star Line briefly chartered Mobile, and then the Byron Steamship Company bought her and renamed her King Alexander after Alexander of Greece. The company was a UK-based subsidiary of the National Greek Line. Hence King Alexander was registered in London but her new route was between Greece and the USA.

In 1923 United American Lines bought King Alexander and restored her original name Cleveland. Prohibition in the United States had begun in 1920, so UAL registered her in Panama to enable her to serve liquor aboard. UAL had Cleveland refitted in Hamburg and restored to her Hamburg – New York route.

Final years
In 1926 HAPAG bought back Cleveland and two other former HAPAG passenger liners from UAL for ℛℳ 10 million.

In 1929 a Bauer-Wach exhaust turbine system was added to each of Clevelands engines. Exhaust steam from the low-pressure cylinder drove a turbine, which via double-reduction gearing and a Föttinger fluid coupling drove the same shaft as the reciprocating engine. The two turbines increased Clevelands total installed power to 2,046 NHP.

Cleveland was laid up from 1931. In 1933 HAPAG sold her back to Blohm & Voss for scrap.

References

Bibliography

External links

 – postcards of Cleveland in her civilian liveries

1908 ships
Maritime incidents in 1912
Ocean liners of the United Kingdom
Passenger ships of Panama
Ships built in Hamburg
Ships of the Hamburg America Line
Steamships of Germany
Steamships of Panama
Steamships of the United Kingdom
Steamships of the United States
Transports of the United States Navy
World War I passenger ships of Germany